Martina Helga Hellmann ( Opitz; born 12 December 1960) is a retired German track and field athlete who represented East Germany.  She was the Olympic champion in the discus throw at the 1988 Summer Olympics.  She also won the World Championship in that event in 1983 and again in 1987.

Born in Leipzig, Saxony, Hellmann was sixteen years old when she began participating in the event.  In 1977 she gave the participants' oath at the opening of the East German gymnastics and sport festival.  That summer she set the world record for 16-year-olds with a throw of 55.00 meters.  Her career was plagued by sickness and injury until 1983 when she became the surprise world champion.  She was unable to compete at the 1984 summer Olympic games due to her country's boycott.

On 6 September 1988 she threw the discus 78.14 metres, farther than any woman had ever thrown it before or after. However, this throw was in an unofficial tournament in the East German training camp at Kienbaum set up to decide the final GDR place for the Olympic games in Seoul and was not eligible to be considered a world record. During this session she threw the following distances, two of them exceeding the world record at the time, and two more that were ever exceeded by only one female thrower: 76.92m – 78.14m – 70.52m – 76.56m – 75.66m – 74.04m (the women's world record, set in July 1988, is 76.80 m). Ilke Wyludda threw a lifetime best 75.36 m, but had to stay home. Five of Hellmann's throws during that competition were better than her official best of 72.92 metres, achieved in August 1987 in Potsdam, and which ranks her ninth on the world all-time list and sixth among German discus throwers, behind Gabriele Reinsch, Ilke Wyludda, Diana Gansky-Sachse, Irina Meszynski and Gisela Beyer.

After the 1992 Summer Olympics, where she was eliminated during qualification, she retired.  She later was the head of a sports group of the insurance company AOK and became a manager at a cabaret in Leipzig.

Hellmann represented the SC DHfK Leipzig sport club and trained with Rolf Wittenbecher and Bernhard Thomas. During her active career she was 1.78 meters tall and weighed 85 kilograms.

Evidence of doping
There is substantial evidence that nearly all East German Olympic track and field athletes in the 1980s, including Hellman, used steroids to enhance athletic performance as part of a state-sponsored program.

International competitions

References

External links
 
 
 

1960 births
Living people
Athletes from Leipzig
East German female discus throwers
German female discus throwers
Olympic athletes of East Germany
Olympic athletes of Germany
Olympic gold medalists for East Germany
Athletes (track and field) at the 1988 Summer Olympics
Athletes (track and field) at the 1992 Summer Olympics
World Athletics Championships athletes for East Germany
World Athletics Championships athletes for Germany
World Athletics Championships medalists
European Athletics Championships medalists
Medalists at the 1988 Summer Olympics
Olympic gold medalists in athletics (track and field)
Goodwill Games medalists in athletics
World Athletics Championships winners
Competitors at the 1986 Goodwill Games